The Hells Angels Motorcycle Club, an international outlaw biker gang, has been involved in multiple crimes, alleged crimes, and violent incidents in Canada. The Criminal Intelligence Service Canada (CISC) has designated the Hells Angels an outlaw motorcycle gang. Hells Angels MC have been linked with drug trafficking and production, as well as many violent crimes including murder, in Canada.

Background
According to CBC News, the Hells Angels have thirty-four chapters operating in Canada with 1,260 full-fledged (patched) members. According to this article, the Hells Angels had at that time fifteen chapters in Ontario, eight in British Columbia, five in Quebec, three in Alberta, two in Saskatchewan and one in Manitoba.

In a speech to the House of Commons, Bloc Québécois MP Réal Ménard (Hochelaga) stated that there were thirty-eight HAMC chapters across Canada in the mid-1990s. The Vancouver Sun newspaper reports that Canada has more Hells Angels members per capita than any other country, including the U.S., where there are chapters in about twenty states. The Canadian Hells Angels have partnered the Medellín Cartel, the Rizzuto crime family, the Sinaloa Cartel and the West End Gang in criminal operations. Additionally, the club has also formed alliances with various street gangs, including the Independent Soldiers, the Red Scorpions, the United Nations and the White Boy Posse, and smaller motorcycle gangs, such as Bacchus, the Gate Keepers and the Red Devils.

The Hells Angels established their first Canadian chapters in the province of Quebec during the seventies. On 5 December 1977, the first Canadian chapter was founded in Montreal when a club called the Popeyes led by Yves Buteau were "patched over". In September 1979, new Angels chapters were established in Laval and Sherbrooke. In Western Canada, in 1983 a Vancouver club known as Satan's Angels were patched over to form the first BC chapter. In December 1984, the 13th Tribe biker club in Halifax, Nova Scotia led by David "Wolf" Carroll "patched over" to become the first Hells Angels chapter in Atlantic Canada. The Outlaws and several affiliated independent clubs such as Satan's Choice and Para-Dice Riders were able to keep the Angels from assuming a dominant position in Ontario, Canada's most populous province until 2000. On the Prairies, the Grim Reapers of Alberta, Los Bravos in Manitoba, and several other independent clubs across the Prairies formed a loose alliance that kept the Hells Angels from assuming dominance in the Prairie provinces until the late nineties. In 1997 the Grim Reapers club of Calgary, Alberta were patched over and in 1998, the Rebels of Saskatoon, Saskatchewan joined. By the end of 2000, under the leadership of Walter "Nurget" Stadnick, and after the largest patchover in Canadian history occurred in Montreal with the bulk of the Ontario biker clubs "patching over" on 29 December 2000, the Hells Angels had become the dominant club not just in BC and Quebec, but all across Canada, with chapters in at least seven of ten provinces and affiliates in at least two of the three territories. On 12 January 2002, a Hells Angels convention in Toronto was gate-clashed by the mayor of Toronto, Mel Lastman, who was photographed shaking hands with an Angel, Tony Biancaflora, and told the media the Angels were "fantastic" for bringing so much "business" to Toronto, saying: "You know, they just a nice bunch of guys". Josée-Anne Desrochers, the mother of the 11-year-old Daniel Desrochers killed by an Angel bombing in 1995, stated: "I find it degrading. Is the government with us or is it the bikers who are with the government?". In 2006, the Bandidos, the only possible rivals to the Hells Angels in Canada, self-destructed with the Shedden massacre, leaving the Angels as the only national outlaw biker club in Canada. An officer with the Ontario Provincial Police stated that after the Shedden massacre that: "The Hells Angels were on easy street. They had a monopoly across Canada."

By province

British Columbia

The first three British Columbia HAMC chapters, in Nanaimo, Vancouver and White Rock, were founded on 23 July 1983 after a merger of the Satan's Angels club. A fourth chapter, in East Vancouver, was established later that year and became the Hells Angels' leading chapter in the province. According to a joint report by the Royal Canadian Mounted Police (RCMP) and United States Drug Enforcement Administration (DEA), the club was in control of "all outlaw motorcycle gang activity in British Columbia" by the mid-1980s. The Hells Angels have since expanded to ten chapters and membership of over a hundred in the province.

On 6 April 1988, David Ernest "Screwy" Swartz, a "full patch" member of the Hells Angels' East End Vancouver chapter, was shot and killed with a rifle by his friend Lynn Neil Eddington, who then killed himself with the same gun. The men had been drinking heavily at a party in a house at 15771 96th Avenue in Surrey when they began fighting. Eddington then left and returned with the rifle before he committed the murder-suicide. According the Lynn Neil's mother Jeanne Eddington, her son had been despondent after separating from his wife Cindy "and he was looking for a party" on the night of his death. In an interview with Carol Volkart of the Vancouver Sun, Jeanne stated her belief that her son had killed himself after shooting Swartz because he feared the Hells Angels would avenge his death and he did not want his family to become targets of retaliation. She said: "It was an argument between two young men who had been drinking. It was not a Hells Angel killing; it was not a gang-related killing". Shortly before the beginning of Eddington's funeral on 10 April 1988, three Hells Angels entered the Valley View Funeral Home chapel and began spitting on his coffin. Members of Eddington's family were warned: "We haven't finished with you yet". The following day, a message was left on the answering machine of Jeanne Eddington threatening: "That bastard Neil killed one of us and you guys are next". Jeanne Eddington reported the threat to the Surrey RCMP but did not request police protection. The East End chapter has since organised the annual "Screwy ride" in Swartz's memory. His son also became a member of the club.

In July 2003, a man offered to give police information and became the police agent around whom much of the E-Pandora investigation ensued. Charges arose from project E-Pandora, an extensive police investigation, into the alleged criminal activities of the East End charter of the Hells Angels. The evidence in this case included intercepted private communications including telephone and audio recordings, physical surveillance, and expert evidence. The case would eventually be dubbed the trial of R. v. Giles, and would see three charged individuals appear before the Supreme Court of British Columbia (SCBC). 72 appearances would span from 14 May 2007 until 20 February 2008 and, by order of Madam Justice Anne MacKenzie, include a publication ban on related trials.

In late 2004 to 2005, the culmination of investigations into the actions of the motorcycle club led to charges against 18 people, including members of the Hells Angels and other associates of the gang.

On 27 March 2008, the SCBC Justice MacKenzie ruled against prosecutors who had attempted to convict a Hells Angels member of possession for the benefit of a criminal organization. Although two associates of the Hells Angels, David Roger Revell and Richard Andrew Rempel were convicted of possession for the purpose of trafficking, Justice MacKenzie concluded that with the acquittal of the only Hells Angel member being tried, David Francis Giles, on a charge of possession of cocaine for the purpose of trafficking, a second charge against him (count two) of possessing it for the benefit of a criminal organization had to fail as well. In summary, Revell and Rempel were found guilty but Giles was found not guilty on either count. Also, Revell and Rempel were found not guilty on the charge of possession of cocaine for the purpose of trafficking.

In her acquittal of Giles, Justice MacKenzie said she found the evidence against him was "weak" and intercepted communications were "unreliable" because they were difficult to hear. She further stated that the Crown prosecutors had failed to demonstrate beyond a reasonable doubt the group was working to the "benefit of, at the direction of or in association with a criminal organization, to wit: the East End charter of the Hells Angels".

Project Halo, a three-year investigation by the Combined Forces Special Enforcement Team of the RCMP, into alleged criminal activity with the Nanaimo chapter. The investigation culminated in the search warrant being executed on 12 December 2003. On 9 November 2007 a seizure order was executed, under section 467.12(1) of the Criminal Code, on the clubhouse by dozens of heavily armed RCMP officers.[80]

David Giles, a founding member and former vice-president of the Hells Angels' Kelowna chapter, was sentenced to eighteen years in prison by the Supreme Court on 31 March 2017 after he was convicted of conspiracy to import cocaine, conspiracy to traffic, and possession for the purpose of trafficking. On 25 August 2012, he and seven others were arrested after brokering a drug deal with undercover RCMP officers posing as South American drug lords. He made a $4 million down payment on the delivery of what was purported to be 200 kilograms of cocaine to a Burnaby warehouse. Giles' sentence was the longest prison term ever handed down to a member of the Hells Angels in British Columbia. Giles, who was originally from eastern Canada and formed a close relationship with Maurice "Mom" Boucher, died in an Abbotsford hospital on 1 July 2017, aged 67.

Manitoba
In August 1996, three men were shot dead inside a home in West Kildonan, Winnipeg as part of a feud over control of drug and prostitution rackets between members of the Manitoba Warriors and associates of the Hells Angels. Two men were convicted of first-degree murder and sentenced to life in prison with no chance of parole for twenty-five years. A third accused was acquitted. The Hells Angels' expansion into Manitoba began with a relationship with Los Bravos, a local motorcycle club. In 2000, Los Bravos were "patched over," becoming a full-fledged HAMC chapter.

On February 15, 2006, the Manitoba Integrated Organized Crime Task Force, along with over 150 police officers from the RCMP, Winnipeg Police Service and Brandon Police Service, made numerous arrests and conducted searches as part of the investigation of Project Defense. Thirteen people were indicted on a variety of charges, including drug trafficking, extortion, proceeds of crime, and organized crime related offenses.

Project Defense was initiated in November 2004 and focused on high level members of drug trafficking cells in the province of Manitoba, including members of the Manitoba Hells Angels. During the investigation police made numerous seizures that totaled in excess of seven kilograms of cocaine and three kilograms of methamphetamine from drug traffickers within the Manitoba Hells Angels organization and other drug trafficking cells. Arrest warrants were issued for thirteen individuals and 12 search warrants were authorized for locations in Winnipeg and area.

This long-term covert investigation was initiated by the Manitoba Integrated Organized Crime Task Force, which was established in the spring of 2004 when an Agreement was signed between the Winnipeg Police Service, the RCMP, the Brandon Police Service and the Province of Manitoba. The mandate of the task force was to disrupt and dismantle organized crime in the province of Manitoba.

On December 12, 2007, Project Drill came to an end, with Winnipeg Police raiding the Hells Angels clubhouse on Scotia Street. Project Drill started the previous evening with arrests in Thompson and continued throughout the night and early morning in Winnipeg and St. Pierre-Jolys. During the course of Project Drill, police seized vehicles, approximately $70,000 cash, firearms, marijuana, Hells Angel related documents/property and other offense related property. As of December 12, 14 people were in custody and four were still being sought.

Police said it was the second time the chapter president was the target in a police sting since the gang set up shop in the city in 2001. Hells Angels prospect member Al LeBras was also arrested at his Barber Street home in Wednesday's raids.

The recently amended Criminal Property Forfeiture Act gives the province the power to seize the proceeds of crime. Police have exercised similar authority against Hells Angels members in other Canadian cities.

On December 2, 2009, Project Divide culminated with 26 arrests, and 8 arrest warrants still outstanding after the year-long investigation. The investigation and arrests targeted alleged drug-trafficking and related activities of the Zig Zag Crew – a puppet club of the Hells Angels Winnipeg chapter.

Other joint investigations include:
 Project Develop, a joint 18-month investigation with Ontario, New Brunswick, and British Columbia
 In January 2006, Project Husky, a two-year investigation involving police forces in Ontario, Quebec and Alberta, resulted in the arrest of twenty-seven suspects including five full-patch Angels from across Eastern and Central Canada
 Project Koker, 23-month investigation in Edmonton and Calgary
 Project Halo, a three-year investigation by the Combined Forces Special Enforcement Team of the RCMP, into alleged criminal activity with the Nanaimo chapter. The investigation culminated in the search warrant being executed on December 12, 2003. On November 9, 2007, a seizure order was executed, under section 467.12(1) of the Criminal Code, on the clubhouse by dozens of heavily armed RCMP officers.

Nova Scotia
The 13th Tribe biker club in Halifax led by David "Wolf" Carroll "patched over" to become the first Hells Angels chapter in Atlantic Canada on 5 December 1984. According to the Royal Canadian Mounted Police (RCMP) and United States Drug Enforcement Administration (DEA), the HAMC saw the Port of Halifax as a pivotal entry point for cocaine shipments from Florida and South America, and the Hells Angels' amalgamation of the 13th Tribe allowed the club "to consolidate control of drug trafficking on Canada's East Coast".

On 6 August 1993, four Hells Angels members on board the Fortune Endeavor jettisoned a 750 kilogram cocaine shipment off the coast of Sheet Harbour after the ship suffered mechanical failure, leaving the ship's crew with no choice but to accept a tow from a Canadian Coast Guard vessel. The drug consignment, stored in waterproof packets hidden inside nine cast iron sewer pipes, had been transferred to the Fortune Endeavor after it rendezvoused in international waters with a ship that had left Venezuela. As part of a conspiracy organized by the Montreal and Quebec City Hells Angels chapters, along with the Rizzuto crime family, the cocaine was intended to be dumped in the St. Lawrence River off Anticosti Island and later retrieved by the trawler Annick C II with the use of sonar and the assistance of a team of divers. On 25 August 1993, the RCMP raided 39 locations in Nova Scotia, Quebec and New Brunswick and Newfoundland and Labrador, arresting nineteen people in connection with the narcotics shipment. Four trawlers, a speedboat and a yacht were also seized. The submerged cocaine was retrieved by the Canadian Navy submersible Pisces IV and diving support vessel HMCS Cormorant on 14 November 1994. Several Hells Angels, as well as Rizzuto family associate Raynald Desjardins, were ultimately convicted in the case.

As a result of tensions between the Hells Angels and crack cocaine dealer Sean Simmons dating as far back as the mid-1990s, "full patch" Hells Angel Neil Smith ordered the killing of Simmons, who had allegedly also had an affair with Smith's girlfriend. In exchange for the reduction of a drug debt owed to Smith, two of his partners in his drug-dealing business, Paul Derry and Wayne James, agreed to carry out the murder. Another man, Steven Gareau, was tasked with locating Simmons. On October 3, 2000, James, Gareau, James' nephew Dean Kelsie and Derry's wife Tina Potts traveled to Simmons' apartment building in Dartmouth. Kelsie then fatally shot Simmons in the building's lobby. Kelsie was convicted of first-degree murder and conspiracy to commit murder in 2003, and sentenced to life in prison with no chance of parole for at least 25 years. The Nova Scotia Court of Appeal overturned the conviction in 2018, and a new trial was ordered. In March 2019, the Supreme Court of Canada ruled that a new trial was not necessary, upheld Kelsie's conspiracy conviction, and reduced the first-degree murder conviction to the lesser charge of second-degree murder.

Ontario
The Hells Angels chapter in London, Ontario was dominated by two brothers, John and Jimmy Coates. John Coates was a large statured man, with a height of 6 foot 7 inches, and weighing 300 pounds, and worked for the Angels' Sherbrooke chapter, while his younger brother Jimmy, although not as big as his older brother, was described as a very intimidating individual.  In July 2001, Gerry Smith, owner of a car dealership in London was threatened by a Hells Angels member, Douglas "Plug" Johnson who told him had to pay the Angels $70,000 dollars immediately. The following week, Jimmy Coates, the president of the Angels' London chapter at the time, arrived to tell Smith and verbally threatened him by saying, "We know where you live. We know you have a wife. We know you have a daughter". Smith informed the police of the threat. A week later, Coates, Johnson and another Angel, Thomas Walinshaw, knocked on the door of Johnson's house to tell him to pay the $70,000 as Walinshaw maintained he "didn't want to see anyone get hurt". Finally after Smith paid the $70,000, the police arrested all three men for extortion. At their trial, the three men maintained that they had no weapons, but the Crown Attorney, Elizabeth Maguire, argued that the mere fact the men were wearing jackets with the Hells Angels patches when they went to Smith's house was a threat alone, saying: "The weapon of that was held to Mr. Smith's head, his wife's head, his daughter's head was the Hells Angels". The three men pleaded guilty to lesser charges. On 7 January 2002, four members of the Jackals, the Angels' puppet club in London, arrived at the house of Thomas Huges, the president of the Outlaws' London chapter, at 434 Egerton. Hughes and another Outlaw, Marcus Cornelisse, opened fire, leading to a shoot-out that one Jackal, Eric Davignon, shot in the stomach. The shoot-out ended with the Jackels fleeing in their car as Hughes and Cornelisse ran down the street shooting at them.

In September 2004, two Angels, Steven "Tiger" Lindsay and Raymond Bonner, were convicted of extorting $75,000 from a black-market satellite dealer in Barrie. Both Angels had arrived at the man's house wearing their patches while a police bug recorded Lindsay as saying to pay the money or else deal with "five other guys that are fucking the same kind of motherfucker as I am". Justice Micelle Fuerst also convicted the two men of gangsterism, saying "...they presented themselves not as individuals, but as members of a group with a reputation for violence and intimidation. They deliberately invoked their membership in the HAMC with the intent to inspire fear in the victim. They committed extortion with the intent to do so in association with a criminal organization, the HAMC to which they belonged".

In September 2006, after an 18-month investigation conducted by numerous law enforcement agencies and dubbed "Project Tandem," 500 officers and 21 tactical teams raided property connected to the Hells Angels chapters in Ontario. At least 27 members were arrested of which 15 were members of the Hells Angels. Property seized was worth more than 1 million dollars and included $470,000 in cash, $300,000 in vehicles and $140,000 in motorcycles. During the raids, drugs such as cocaine and ecstasy were seized; the total street value of drugs seized was more than 3 million dollars. Project Tandem was made possible by recruiting Steven Gault, the treasurer of the Angels' Oshawa chapter, to serve as an informer, who is believed to have been the first Canadian "full patch" Hells Angel to wear a wire for the police and who served as the star witness for the Crown in the subsequent trials.

In April 2007, after another 18-month investigation, this one dubbed "Project Develop," 32 Club Houses were raided in Ontario, New Brunswick and British Columbia. The Hells Angels Clubhouse on 498 Eastern Avenue in Toronto was raided by the Biker Enforcement Unit of the Ontario Provincial Police (OPP) and members of the Toronto Police Service on April 4, 2007, at least 15 members of the Hells Angels were detained and charged with drug and weapons offenses at the Eastern Avenue Clubhouse raid. According to police, Project Develop seized some 500 litres of GHB worth an estimated $996,000, nine kilograms of cocaine, two kilograms of hashish and oxycodone and Viagra pills. Police also seized $21,000 in cash. Project Develop also seized 67 rifles, five handguns, three pairs of brass knuckles and a police baton. Project Develop was made possible by recruiting David Atwell, the sergeant-at-arms of one of the Angels' Toronto chapters, to serve as an informer.

On May 21, 2011, five of the accused arrested as part of Project Develop were convicted by a jury of various drug offences including trafficking in cocaine and oxycodone, participating in a conspiracy to traffic GHB and possession of GHB for the purpose of trafficking. One of the accused was convicted of possessing a restricted firearm without a license. However, one accused, represented by defence lawyer Lenny Hochberg, was acquitted of two counts of trafficking handguns and possession of brass knuckles and another accused, Larry Pooler the Toronto chapter vice-president who represented himself, was acquitted of two counts of possessing unrestricted firearms without a license, two counts of trafficking oxycodone and one count of participating in a conspiracy to traffic GHB. Furthermore, all accused were acquitted of all charges of acting in association with, or for the benefit of, a criminal organization.

Quebec

Background
Quebec's economic crisis of the 1920s saw many of the province's urban population heading for the rural communities in order to cultivate lands to provide for themselves and their families. The settlers' children, like many youth of this era, were rebellious and rejected their parents' values. The period from 1936 to 1960 is remembered by Québécois as the Grande Noirceur ("Great Darkness") when Quebec was for the most part ruled by the ultra-conservative Union Nationale party who imposed traditional Catholic values in a way now considered to be oppressive. With the 1960 provincial election that resulted in the Union Nationale being defeated by the Quebec Liberals, which is considered to be the beginning of the Quiet Revolution that saw Quebec go during the course of a decade from being a very conservative to being a very liberal society. As part of the reaction against the "medieval" Catholic values of the Grande Noirceur saw the emergence of a hedonist culture in Quebec with la belle province having, for example, a significantly higher rate of drug use and illegitimate births than English Canada. As part of the same backlash against the "suffocating" conformism of the Grande Noirceur, outlaw biker clubs became extremely popular in Quebec in the 1960s as many young French-Canadian men saw the outlaw biker culture as a way of expressing rebelliousness and machismo, and by 1968 Quebec had 350 outlaw biker clubs.

By the 1960s, Quebec outlaw motorcycle clubs incorporated many of the same characteristics as American biker clubs, although they mainly operated in rural communities instead of in major cities. One result of having so many outlaw biker clubs in the same province was an especially brutal competition for the control of organized crime rackets in Quebec. The crime journalist James Dubro stated about the distinctive outlaw biker sub-culture of Quebec: "There's always has been more violence in Quebec. In the biker world it's known as the Red Zone. I remember an Outlaws hit man telling me he was scared going to Montreal." The expansion of these groups flourished during the 1970s, as a few popular gangs, notably the Hells Angels and the Outlaws, grew almost 45% due to Quebec's biker groups affiliating themselves with their American counterparts.

On 17 February 1978, Yves "Apache" Trudeau, the Hells Angels leading assassin, killed an Outlaw outside of a Montreal bar. In the ensuring biker war between the two gangs, Trudeau confirmed his reputation as a "psychopathic killer" as he killed 18 out of the 23 Outlaws slain during the conflict. The conflict ended in 1984 with the Hells Angels as the leading biker gang in Quebec and the Outlaws as the leading gang in Ontario. In 1985, in the Lennoxville massacre, the Angels liquidated their chapter in Laval, which caused much them disorganization with many of their leaders being imprisoned and the national president of Hells Angels Canada, Michel "Sky" Langois, fleeing to Morocco to escape an arrest warrant for first degree murder. The Quebec branch of the Hells Angels at its prime included various clubhouses across Quebec which housed many of the gang's puppet groups, who would often carry out the gang's criminal activity. Every Quebec region had its own puppet club: the Rockers in Montreal, the Rowdy Ones in Sorel, the Evil Ones in Drummondville, the Satan's Guard in the Saguenay region, and the Jokers in St-Jean, which includes Maurice Boucher's son, Francis, as a full-fledged member.

Independent drug dealer Jean-Claude "La Couette" Maltais was fatally shot at least five times with a 9mm pistol by two unidentified suspects on a snowmobile as he left the Faubourg Sagamie shopping centre in Jonquière on 29 January 1993. Prior to his death, Maltais had refused to capitulate to the Hells Angels' Trois-Rivières chapter led by Louis "Mélou" Roy and Richard "Crow" Émond, and he had reportedly considered bombing the Hells Angels' clubhouse on Rue St. Paul.

Quebec Biker war
The Quebec Biker war between the Hells Angels and the Rock Machine began in 1994 and continued until late 2002 and claimed more than 162 lives, including innocent bystanders. Maurice (aka Mom) Boucher was the leader of the Quebec chapters and second-in-command of the Canadian Nomad chapter, a chapter with no fixed geographic base. On 13 September 2000, Michel Auger, the crime correspondent of Le Journal de Montréal was shot five times in the back while opening the trunk of his car in the parking lot of Le Journal de Montréal, and was almost killed. In the aftermath of the attempting assassination of Auger, journalists demonstrated in Montreal demanding that the Canadian government pass an RICO type act that would see the Hells Angels declared a criminal organization. In October 2000, a bar owner in the town of Terrebonne named Francis Laforest refused to permit the Rowdy Ones, a puppet club of the Hells Angels, to sell drugs in his bar. As Laforest was walking his dog, he was attacked on the streets in the daylight by three masked men who beat him to death with baseball bats. Led by Auger, a protest took place in Montreal to honor Laforest with Auger saying of Quebec's murderous outlaw bikers: "They believed that they are on the top of the world. The criminals had built up a system so sophisticated that they are above the law...We are the only country in the world where the gangs have a free ride". In May 2002, Boucher received a life sentence, with no possibility of parole for at least 25 years, after being convicted of two counts of first-degree murder for the killings of two Canadian prison guards, ambushed on their way home.

Anti-gang legislation, investigations
On April 15, 2009, operation SharQc was conducted by the Sûreté du Québec. The first specialized organized crime law enforcement task force in the province was composed of the RCMP (Royal Canadian Mounted Police), the Sûreté du Québec and the Montréal Police. Their goal was to investigate the Nomad chapter of the Hells Angels in the Montreal and Quebec City regions until it was dismantled two years later to make way for a bigger, province-wide Task force.

The Hells Angels threat in Quebec and Canada resulted in the first anti-gang law in Canadian legislation, as the Canadian government wished to build on the success of the American anti-racketeering legislation known as RICO. Furthermore, during the period the Canadian anti-gang legislation was created, many Montrealers were experiencing a high volume of violent acts which threatened civilians.

Arrests and acquittal
On April 15, 2009, operation SharQc was conducted by the Sûreté du Québec. According to police, at the time it was the biggest strike at the HAMC in Canada's history and probably in all of HAMC's history. In all, 177 strikes were conducted by the police, 123 members were arrested, charged with for first-degree murder, attempted murder, gangsterism, or drug trafficking. The police seized $5 million in cash, dozens of kilograms of cocaine, marijuana and hashish, and thousands of pills. The operation was expected to lead to the closing of 22 unsolved murders. Operation SharQc involved a full-patch member of the gang turning informant, a very rare occurrence in Quebec. In October 2015, Quebec Superior Court Judge James Brunton ruled that delay between the arrests in 2009 as part of Operation SharQc and 2015 violated the right to a speedy trial guaranteed by the Charter of Rights and Freedoms and dismissed all of the charges against the Hell's Angels arrested as part of Operation SharQc.

References

Criminal allegations and incidents in Canada
Organized crime groups in Canada
Gangs in British Columbia
Gangs in Vancouver
Gangs in Manitoba
Gangs in Nova Scotia
Gangs in Ontario
Gangs in Toronto
Gangs in Quebec
Gangs in Montreal